George Fulton (born 10 November 1977 in Birkenhead, Merseyside, United Kingdom) is a British-Pakistani television journalist, writer and producer. Born and raised in Birkenhead, he first visited Pakistan to launch a BBC produced political talk show Question Time Pakistan. After moving to Pakistan and working on various ventures, George has now launched his YouTube channel Desi George, where he frequently collaborates and produces videos featuring Shaniera Akram (Australian social worker and wife of Wasim Akram) about Pakistan and its culture.

Personal life 

George is the youngest among his three siblings. He is the only brother to two elder sisters, Mary and Laura. Fulton got married in Pakistan after meeting his wife, Kiran, at Telebiz (a production house) in 2002, where she was a producer. He married Kiran and stayed in the country for nine years. In 2011, the couple moved to the UK, where they lived for more than four years. 
 
After the passing of Kiran’s mother, George moved back to Pakistan and has been living here since 2015. Currently, he resides in Karachi and is the father of two children.

Career 
A journalist and PR professional, George, was associated with the BBC back in 2002 when work commitments brought him to Karachi, where he hosted the BBC produced political talk show Question Time Pakistan. He then produced another show for BBC titled Hard Talk Pakistan.
 
While staying in Pakistan, George was offered to host a TV show by Geo TV to share his experiences in Pakistan. Named ‘George ka Pakistan’, was the reality TV show that first made the British journalist known across the country. After George Fulton had traveled all over the country, plowing fields with Punjabi farmers and building Kalashnikovs with the Pashtuns, he was voted a real Pakistani by the audience and was given a Pakistani passport.
 
Later, he joined AAJ TV, where he launched another show called News, Views and Confused, - a variation of the famous Have I Got News for You. He produced and scripted the show’s first season, before moving on to produce Aaj TV’s morning show along with his wife titled Kiran Aur George. The duo also hosted their show.

Upon his return to Pakistan, George worked as Director of PR for M&C Saatchi before establishing his YouTube channel.

References

External links 
George on Twitter
The Guardian on George
Kiran Aur George Aaj Site

1977 births
British male journalists
Pakistani male journalists
British television personalities
British television producers
Pakistani television producers
People from Birkenhead
British emigrants to Pakistan
Naturalised citizens of Pakistan
Pakistani people of English descent
Pakistani people of Scottish descent
Living people
Journalists from Karachi
People from Neston